The black rail (Laterallus jamaicensis) is a mouse-sized member of the rail family Rallidae that occurs in both North and South America.

Taxonomy
The black rail was formally described in 1789 by the German naturalist Johann Friedrich Gmelin in his revised and expanded edition of Carl Linnaeus's Systema Naturae. He placed it with all the rails in the genus Rallus and coined the binomial name Rallus jamaicensis. Gmelin based his description on the "Least water hen" that had been described and illustrated in 1760 by the English naturalist George Edwards in his Gleanings of Natural History. Edwards had obtained a preserved specimen that had been brought to London from Jamaica by Patrick Browne. Browne had briefly mentioned the rail in his book "The Civil and Natural History of Jamaica". The black rail is now placed with 12 other small rails and crakes in the genus Laterallus that was introduced in 1855 by George Robert Gray. The genus name is a portmanteau of Rallus lateralis, a synonym of the binomial name for the rufous-sided crake, the type species of the genus. The specific epithet jamaicensis is from "Jamaica", the type locality.

There are five recognized subspecies:
 California rail, L. j. coturniculus (Ridgway, 1874) – found in both fresh and salt water marshes of California and Arizona, and is a resident species. The California rail can be distinguished from other subspecies by its shorter bill, and brown crown and upper back. The California Fish and Game Commission listed  L. j. coturniculus as Threatened in 1971 due to loss of wetland habitat.    

 Eastern black rail, L. j. jamaicensis (Gmelin, JF, 1789) – found in eastern North America, the Caribbean, and Central America. Nicknamed the "feathered mouse", the subspecies is partially migratory, breeding in the United States and wintering further south. The US Fish and Wildlife Service declared L. j. jamaicensis a threatened species under the Endangered Species Act in October 2020. The eastern black rail can be differentiated from other subspecies by its gray crown and light brown nape.

 L. j. murivagans (Riley, 1916) –  found on the coast of Peru. This subspecies is over all paler, with white bars in the undertail coverts, distinguishing it from other subspecies. There is little information available on this subspecies.

 L. j. salinasi (Philippi, 1857) – found in Argentina and Chile, and is the southernmost subspecies. On average, this subspecies is larger than the other subspecies. This subspecies can be distinguished from the others by the large rufus patch on the upper back.
Junín rail, L. j.tuerosi Fjeldså, 1983 –  only found in the marshes of Lake Junín, Peru. The Junín Rail is considered Endangered because of its limited range. The Junín rail can be distinguished from other subspecies by its plain undertail coverts and pale legs.

Description
The black rail is a small black bird with a short bill. Black rails usually weigh 29-39 g, are 10-15 cm in length, and have a wingspan of 8.7-11.0 in (22-28 cm).The body is dark, with white speckles along the back and wings. Both the beak and legs are dark. Adults have a red eye that appears around 3 months of age. 

It will often make its presence known with its distinctive ki-ki-krr call or an aggressive, presumably territorial, growl. This is primarily uttered during the night, when these birds are most vocal. The peak of vocalization is during the first two weeks of May, when breeding and courtship behaviors are also at their peak.

Distribution and habitat
It is found in scattered parts of North America, the Caribbean, and the Pacific region of South America, usually in coastal salt marshes but also in some freshwater marshes. It is extinct or threatened in many locations due to habitat loss. The largest populations in North America are in Florida and California.

Behaviour and ecology
The black rail is rarely seen and prefers running in the cover of the dense marsh vegetation to flying.

Breeding
This rail is territorial during the breeding season, and occasionally males will mate with two or more females. The nests of this bird are placed on the ground, in dense, swampy vegetation or in patches of flooded grass. The nests are bowl-shaped and built with vegetation loosely woven.

The clutch of this bird usually consists of six to eight creamy white speckled, with reddish-brown spots, eggs. They are incubated by both parents, taking shifts of approximately one hour each, for 16 to 20 days. The  young then hatch.

In 2015, the first ever breeding by black rails in South Carolina was captured through a  camera study. This species was once thought to be a non-breeding visitor to the state.

Food and feeding 
The black rail is an opportunistic feeder and consumes a wide range of food. Its diet includes seeds, insects, crustaceans and mollusks. The black rail forages by feeding along the water lines after high and low tide.

Threats
Under the IUCN Red List, the black rail is listed as endangered with decreasing populations. The IUCN estimates there are between 28,000 and  92,000  mature individuals remaining. The largest threats to the Black Rail are habitat destruction and severe weather events. 

The wetland habitat that the black rail depends on has steadily declined through the last several decades, due to draining for development and conversion to agricultural land.  

In addition to declining populations and increasing threats, the black rail is also impacted by the lack of scientific studies available. Because of the secretive and hard to observe nature of the bird, there is very little known about them to help prevent population decline.   

They are preyed upon by many avian (hawks, egrets, and herons) and mammalian (foxes and cats) predators, and rely on the cover of thick marsh vegetation for protection. High tides are a dangerous time for black rails, as they are quite vulnerable to predation outside the marsh.

References

External links 
Black Rails on the Audubon watch list
Back Rails in Chile
Black Rails in inland marshes
Black Rail Bird Sound
Black Rail Video

black rail
Birds of the Americas
Native birds of the Western United States
Native birds of the Plains-Midwest (United States)
Native birds of the Southeastern United States
Birds of the Caribbean
Birds of Mexico
Birds of Belize
Birds of Costa Rica
Birds of Hispaniola
Birds of the Dominican Republic
Birds of Chile
Birds of Peru
black rail
black rail